The 2012 UK Open Qualifier 7 was the seventh of eight 2012 UK Open Darts Qualifiers which was held at the NIA Community Hall in Birmingham on Saturday 5 May.

Prize money

Draw

References

7